Chronicle: The Complete Prestige Recordings 1951–1956 is a box set of 8 CDs with compiled recordings of the American jazz trumpeter and composer Miles Davis, made in sessions between 1951 and 1956 for Prestige Records. It was issued in 1988. The box set contains a 64-page illustrated booklet that includes rare photographs, full discographical details, and an analysis of each session by Dan Morgenstern, Director of the Institute of Jazz Studies at Rutgers University. It is a re-release of the 12 vinyl discs records on 8 CDs in 1980.

Background and recording
The box set is a retrospective compilation of Miles Davis' 17 sessions recorded on the Prestige label between 1951 and 1956. The collection represents a fairly mix of ballads, hard bop, and cool jazz featuring his collaborations with major contemporary jazz artists. 

Most significant are the group on discs six, seven, and eight containing performances by Davis’ first classic quintet with John Coltrane, Red Garland, Paul Chambers and Philly Joe Jones. Among the others featured in this collection are some of the most influential Jazz artists of that time including Sonny Rollins, Thelonious Monk, Milt Jackson, Charles Mingus and Jackie McLean. One historic moment is Round About Midnight which was recorded with Charlie Parker just days before his death.

Track listing

Notes and references 
Information about song details is taken from the box set.

Miles Davis compilation albums
Prestige Records albums
1988 compilation albums